Arja Inkeri Alho (born 21 March 1954) is a Finnish politician. She was member of the Parliament of Finland from 1983 to 1999 and again from 2003 to 2007, representing the constituency of Helsinki until 1999 and then the constituency of Uusimaa since 2003. She also served as the Deputy Minister of Finance of Finland under Prime Minister Paavo Lipponen from 1995 to 1997. She resigned the government in October 1997 when it was revealed that she had agreed to reduce the compensation that Ulf Sundqvist had been sentenced to pay.

Alho is member of the Social Democratic Party. She was member of the city council of Helsinki from 1980 to 1999. She initially graduated from a nursing school in 1977 but later earned a PhD in political science from the University of Helsinki in 2004. Since 2009, she has been editor-in-chief of Ydin magazine.

References

External links 
 Official website

1954 births
Living people
People from Hartola, Finland
Social Democratic Party of Finland politicians
Women government ministers of Finland
Members of the Parliament of Finland (1983–87)
Members of the Parliament of Finland (1987–91)
Members of the Parliament of Finland (1991–95)
Members of the Parliament of Finland (1995–99)
Members of the Parliament of Finland (2003–07)
University of Helsinki alumni
20th-century Finnish women politicians
21st-century Finnish women politicians